Palestrina - Prince of Music is an Italian/German 2009 music film directed by Georg Brintrup. The subject is the life and music of Giovanni Pierluigi da Palestrina (ca.1525-1594), a famous Italian Renaissance composer of sacred music.  He is the best-known 16th-century composer of the Roman School. Filmed in March 2009 on locations mainly in and around L'Aquila and Rome, most of the ancient buildings and historical interiors in the city of L'Aquila  were destroyed by the 2009 L'Aquila earthquake, only a few days after the end of shooting. Palestrina’s music in the film is directed by Flavio Colusso and the Roman Ensemble Seicentonovecento. The film was also titled The Liberation of Music or Die Befreiung der Musik when released in Germany.

Plot
“To achieve artistic and economic independence, Palestrina works with great diplomacy in the shadow of the powerful Roman Catholic Church. Despite strict ecclesiastical rules, he succeeds in modernizing music.” 

The film starts with the death of Giovanni Pierluigi da Palestrina in 1594. Afterwards his son, Iginio, some of his students and colleagues, members of the Cappella Giulia (Julian Chapel) at St. Peter's Basilica, and also members of the Roman clergy give their personal statements or testimony on Palestrina’s life and career: from his childhood, when he is trained as a choir-boy in the circle of the "Roman School" of polyphony founded by Costanzo Festa, to the peak of his career, when the plague and an influenza epidemic take away his two oldest sons and his wife.

These testimonies reveal Palestrina as a typical Renaissance artist who takes his destiny into his own hands and maintains his artistic independence in the middle of the greedy Roman clergy, who are more interested in secular politics than in the spirituality of music. He developed a new style in polyphonic art, the genus novus with a balance between word and sound, in which all voices are separate and   independent from each other. Palestrina finally liberates music from the word. In this style he composes the famous Missa Papae Marcelli, which, after the Council of Trent, becomes the model for sacred music.

After having lost his two sons and his wife, the testimonies reveal with the wink of an eye, that Palestrina, instead of taking holy orders, decided to marry a very rich widow, enabling him to afford the publication of all his scores. In this way his work would never be forgotten.

Palestrina’s music is presented in the film by the Roman ‘Ensemble Seicentonovecento’, conducted by maestro Flavio Colusso.

Cast
 Domenico Galasso as Iginio
 Renato Scarpa as Monsignore Cotta
 Remo Remotti as Filippo Neri
 Giorgio Colangeli as L. Barré
 Stefano Oppedisano as Annibale
 Claudio Marchione as Cristoforo
 Achille Brugnini as Giacchino
 Franco Nero as D. Ferrabosco
 Pasquale di Filippo as G. Severini
 Bartolomeo Giusti as old Palestrina
 Daniele Giuliani as young Palestrina
 Patrizia Bellezza as Virginia Dormuli
 Francesca Catenacci as Lucrezia Gori

Release and reception
Palestrina - Prince of Music premiered at the Auditorium Parco della Musica in Rome November 15, 2009 
It was then shown at "Prix International du Documentaire e du Reportage Mediterraneen" - 15th edition, 
at 11-th International Television Festival ECO, Ohrid Macedonia, at AsoloArtFilmfestival, at Golden Prague International Television Festival 2010, at L´Aquila International Film Festival, L´Aquila Italy 2010, at - october 16 - 20, 2010, at FIFA - Festival international du film sur l'art, Montreal, Canada 2011

References

External links
 

2009 films
Biographical films about musicians
German biographical drama films
Italian biographical drama films
2000s German-language films
2000s Italian-language films
Films about religion
Films set in the 1590s
Films shot in Italy
Films about classical music and musicians
Films about composers
Cultural depictions of classical musicians
Cultural depictions of Italian men
2000s German films